Wesley is a city in Kossuth County, Iowa, United States. The population was 391 at the time of the 2020 census.

History
Wesley was founded April 13, 1872 and incorporated on March 26, 1892.

Geography
Wesley is located at  (43.087557, -93.993140).

Demographics

2010 census
As of the census of 2010, there were 390 people, 171 households, and 110 families living in the city. The racial makeup of the city was 99.5% White, 0.3% Asian, and 0.3% from two or more races. Hispanic or Latino of any race were 2.3% of the population.

There were 171 households, of which 28.1% had children under the age of 18 living with them, 50.9% were married couples living together, 8.2% had a female householder with no husband present, 5.3% had a male householder with no wife present, and 35.7% were non-families. 31.6% of all households were made up of individuals, and 16.4% had someone living alone who was 65 years of age or older. The average household size was 2.28 and the average family size was 2.84.

The median age in the city was 42.4 years. 22.8% of residents were under the age of 18; 5.7% were between the ages of 18 and 24; 25.8% were from 25 to 44; 24.1% were from 45 to 64; and 21.5% were 65 years of age or older. The gender makeup of the city was 52.3% male and 47.7% female.

2000 census
As of the census of 2000, there were 467 people, 189 households, and 130 families living in the city. The racial makeup of the city was 99.14% White, 0.86% from other races. Hispanic or Latino of any race were 0.86% of the population.

There were 189 households, out of which 29.6% had children under the age of 18 living with them, 56.6% were married couples living together, 7.9% had a female householder with no husband present, and 31.2% were non-families. 29.6% of all households were made up of individuals, and 17.5% had someone living alone who was 65 years of age or older. The average household size was 2.47 and the average family size was 3.04.

In the city, the population was spread out, with 27.8% under the age of 18, 4.9% from 18 to 24, 25.7% from 25 to 44, 18.8% from 45 to 64, and 22.7% who were 65 years of age or older. The median age was 39 years. For every 100 females, there were 103.9 males. For every 100 females age 18 and over, there were 92.6 males.

The median income for a household in the city was $39,688, and the median income for a family was $47,500. Males had a median income of $30,568 versus $21,250 for females. The per capita income for the city was $19,225. About 6.3% of families and 11.0% of the population were below the poverty line, including 14.6% of those under age 18 and 13.4% of those age 65 or over.

Education
Lu Verne Community School District serves the community. Since 2015 Lu Verne sends its secondary students to the Algona Community School District, which operates Algona Middle School and Algona High School.

Corwith–Wesley Community School District served the community until it dissolved on July 1, 2015. That district operated a school in Wesley and Corwith–Wesley–Lu Verne High School in Corwith.

In 2009 the Wesley campus closed since the district had been sending students to Lu Verne. The district sold it to the city government, which primarily used it as a storage center, and had removed the school's utilities.

Notable person

Showboat Fisher, Major League Baseball player.

References

External links
 City of Wesley, Iowa Website
 Corwith Wesley LuVerne Times
 City-Data.com

Cities in Kossuth County, Iowa
Cities in Iowa
1892 establishments in Iowa
Populated places established in 1892